Dubautia pauciflorula is a rare species of flowering plant in the family Asteraceae known by the common name Wahiawa Bog dubautia. It is endemic to Hawaii where it is known only from the Wahiawa Mountains on the island of Kauai.

There are fewer than 50 individuals remaining. It was federally listed as an endangered species of the United States in 1991. Like other Dubautia this plant is called na`ena`e.

This member of the silversword alliance was first collected in 1909, and again in 1911, but it went without a name for many decades. It was not collected again until 1979 and it was finally described as a new species in 1981. It grows in wet rainforest habitat near streams. Yellow flowers are borne in heads of two to four.

Threats to this species and its habitat include feral pigs and invasive plant species such as Melastoma candidum. Conservation efforts include the collection of seeds.

References

External links
USDA Plants Profile Dubautia pauciflorula

pauciflorula
Endemic flora of Hawaii
Biota of Kauai
Plants described in 1981